Melissa Marr (born July 25, 1972) is an American author of young adult/urban fantasy novels.

Biography
Marr, a former university English teacher, currently resides in Arizona.  Her first novel was published in 2007, the New York Times bestseller Wicked Lovely.  Along with four more books in that series, which were also New York Times bestsellers, she has also written an adult novel, Graveminder which won the 2011 Goodreads Readers Choice Award for "Best Horror" and was a "Top Pick Fantasy" with VOYA.  She has written other young adult, adult, and children's fiction. She is also a frequent contributor of short fiction to anthologies and has edited one anthology with Kelley Armstrong, with whom she also wrote the series Loki's Wolves, published under the name M.A. Marr.

Bibliography

Young Adult Novels

Wicked Lovely series
Wicked Lovely (2007)
Ink Exchange (2008)
Fragile Eternity (2009)
Radiant Shadows (2010)
Darkest Mercy (2011)

Other Young Adult Novels
 Untamed City: Carnival of Secrets (2012)
 Made For You (2013)
 Seven Black Diamonds (2016)
 One Blood Ruby (2017)

Middle Grade Novels
 Loki's Wolves, as M.A. Marr, with Kelley Armstrong (Spring 2013)
 Odin's Ravens, as M.A. Marr, with Kelley Armstrong (Spring 2014)
 Thor's Serpents, as M.A. Marr, with Kelley Armstrong (Spring 2015)

 The Hidden Knife, (Spring 2021)

Adult Novels

Graveminder (2011)
The Arrivals (2013)
Pretty Broken Things (An Audible Original (2020)

Wicked Lovely Adult series
Cold Iron Heart (2020)

Faery Bargains Adult series
The Wicked & The Dead (2020)

Picture Books
Bunny Roo, I Love You (2015)
Baby Dragon (2019)
Bunny Roo and Duckling Too (2021)

Faery Bargains Adult series
The Wicked & The Dead (2020)

Picture Books
Bunny Roo, I Love You (2015)
Baby Dragon (2019)
Bunny Roo and Duckling Too (2021)

Graphic Novels

Wicked Lovely: Desert Tales series
Volume 1: Sanctuary (2009)
Volume 2: Challenge (2010)
Volume 3: Resolve (2011)

Short fiction

Collections
 Faery Tales and Nightmares (2011)
 Tales of Folk and Fey (2019)

Anthologies Edited
 Enthralled: Paranormal Diversions, with Kelley Armstrong
 Shards and Ashes, with Kelley Armstrong
 Rags and Bones: New Twists on Timeless Tales (2013), with Tim Pratt

Anthologies Contributed To
 Enthralled: Paranormal Diversions
 Teeth: Vampire Tales
 Love Is Hell
 Naked City
 Home Improvement: Undead Edition
 Unbound

NonFiction Anthologies Contributed To
 Life Inside My Mind
 Things We Haven't Said

Awards and honors

Wicked Lovely
New York Public Library's Books for the Teen Age 2008
Amazon's Best Books of 2007: Top 10 Editor's Picks: Teens
IRA Notable Books 2008: Young Adult Fiction

References

External links
Melissa Marr's Website
"Melissa Marr, Literary Goth Writer of Young Adult Fiction" Online article by Steven Williams with linked resources.

21st-century American novelists
American women novelists
American writers of young adult literature
American fantasy writers
Living people
1974 births
Urban fantasy writers
Women science fiction and fantasy writers
21st-century American women writers
RITA Award winners
Women writers of young adult literature
Women romantic fiction writers